Michigan's 24th Senate district is one of 38 districts in the Michigan Senate. The 24th district was created by the 1850 Michigan Constitution, as the 1835 constitution only permitted a maximum of eight senate districts. It has been represented by Republican Ruth Johnson since 2023, succeeding fellow Republican Tom Barrett.

Geography
District 24 encompasses parts of Genesee, Lapeer, Macomb and Oakland counties.

2011 Apportionment Plan
District 24, as dictated by the 2011 Apportionment Plan, surrounded Lansing, and covered all of Clinton, Eaton, and Shiawassee Counties and parts of eastern Ingham County. Communities in the district included Charlotte, Grand Ledge, Eaton Rapids, Potterville, Waverly, DeWitt, St. Johns, Corunna, Durand, Owosso, Williamston, Delta Township, Bath Township, DeWitt Township, and small parts of East Lansing and Lansing proper.

The district overlapped with Michigan's 4th, 7th, and 8th congressional districts, and with the 65th, 67th, 69th, 71st, 85th, and 93rd districts of the Michigan House of Representatives.

List of senators

Recent election results

2018

2014

Federal and statewide results in District 24

Historical district boundaries

References 

24
Clinton County, Michigan
Eaton County, Michigan
Ingham County, Michigan
Shiawassee County, Michigan